Milano, Paris, New York: Finding John Lewis is an album by pianist Sir Roland Hanna performing compositions associated with John Lewis recorded in 2002 and released by the Japanese Venus label.

Reception

AllMusic reviewer Judith Schlesinger stated "This CD represents one venerable pianist paying tribute to another: Sir Roland Hanna and his fine trio playing compositions by, associated with, or written for John Lewis, the musical director of the Modern Jazz Quartet for all of its life. Lewis was admired for his distinctive bop playing and his creative involvement with one of the greatest groups in jazz history, but only one of his originals has become a standard ... In fact, the standouts on this CD are actually Hanna's pieces ... Overall, a genteel and refined session".

Track listing
All compositions by John Lewis except where noted
 "Django" – 6:09
 "Skating in Central Park" – 5:32
 "Afternoon in Paris" – 6:58
 "Milano" – 5:54
 "Bag's Groove" (Milt Jackson) – 6:11
 "New York 19" – 7:16
 "Portrait of John Lewis" (Roland Hanna) – 7:57
 "The Clarion Bells of Zurich" (Hanna) – 5:17
 "Perugia" (Hanna) – 5:49

Personnel 
Sir Roland Hanna – piano
George Mraz – bass
Lewis Nash – drums

References 

2002 albums
Roland Hanna albums
Venus Records albums